Sheung Sze Wan is a bay of Clear Water Bay Peninsula in Sai Kung District, Hong Kong.

Sheung Sze Wan is also the name of a village located on the western shore of the bay.

Villages
Villages in the area include:
 Ha Yeung
 Ha Yeung New Village‎
 Leung Fai Tin‎
 Mau Po‎
 Sheung Sze Wan (village)
 Sheung Yeung
 Tai Hang Hau

Features
 Hong Kong Adventist College
 The Portofino

See also

 Clear Water Bay Road

Bays of Hong Kong
Clear Water Bay Peninsula